Walmer is a large neighborhood of Port Elizabeth, the largest city in Eastern Cape, South Africa.

Geography

History 
It was an independent municipality from 1899 to 1965, when it was absorbed by Port Elizabeth. For unknown reasons, it was named after Walmer Castle, the seat of the Duke of Wellington in Kent, England.

References

Sources 
 Raper, Peter Edmund (2004). New Dictionary of South African Place Names. Johannesburg & Cape Town: Jonathan Ball Publishers. 

Port Elizabeth
Populated places in Nelson Mandela Bay